Work-to-rule (also known as an Italian strike, in Italian: Sciopero bianco, or slowdown in US usage) is a job action in which employees do no more than the minimum required by the rules of their contract or job, and strictly follow time-consuming rules normally not enforced. This may cause a slowdown or decrease in productivity if the employer does not hire enough employees or pay the appropriate salary and as such does not have the requirements needed to run at the level they desire. It is a form of protest against low pay and poor working conditions, and is considered less disruptive than a strike or lockout as obeying the rules is not susceptible to disciplinary action or loss of pay.

In practice there may be ambiguous conditions, for example a contract that requires working additional hours when necessary, or a requirement to work to operational requirements. In such cases workers have been recommended to ask for a written direction to carry out the work, which can be used as evidence if necessary.

Applications

Quiet quitting
Quiet quitting is an application of work-to-rule. Despite the name, the philosophy of quiet quitting is not connected to quitting a job outright, but rather, employees avoid going above and beyond at work by doing the bare minimum required and engage in work-related activities solely within defined work hours. Proponents of quiet quitting also refer to it as acting your wage or calibrated contributing, and say that the goal of quiet quitting is not to disrupt the workplace, but to avoid occupational burnout and to improve work-life balance.

There are no verifiable sources as to who coined the phrase, but it was thought to be inspired by the tang ping ("lying flat") movement that began in April 2021 on Chinese Internet social networks and became a buzzword on Sina Weibo. Later that year, Chinese Internet users combined tang ping with involution, a process researched by American anthropologist Clifford Geertz in his 1963 book, Agricultural Involution. The book gained attention in the late 1980's from social sciences research about China which led to the term, "involution," gaining great attention in China. In 2020, "involution" became one of the most commonly used words on Chinese-language media, where it is used to describe the feeling of exhaustion in an overly competitive society. After tang ping became a buzzword and inspired numerous Internet memes, business magazine ABC Money claimed it resonated with a growing silent majority of youth disillusioned by the officially endorsed "Chinese Dream" that encourages a life of hard work and sacrifice with no actual life satisfaction to show for it.

The phrase, "quiet quitting," became popular during 2022 in the United States, mostly through the social video platform TikTok. In 2022, quiet quitting experienced a surge in popularity in numerous publications following a viral TikTok video which was inspired by a Business Insider article. That same year, Gallup found that roughly half of the U.S. workforce were quiet quitters. 

Industry observers argue the COVID-19 Pandemic accelerated the social movement of quiet quitting, with a resurgence in labor sentiments among Generation Z.

Response

While individual contributors might think in terms of otherwise "engaged workers setting reasonable boundaries", their employers might see them instead as "slackers who are willfully underperforming". Sometimes work-to-rule can be considered by employers as malicious compliance as they pursue legal action against workers. While not legally enforceable under minimum statutory law, employers may enforce customized employment contract terms that the employee agreed to:
 Overtime is waived in part, in whole, or converted to time-in-lieu
 Breaks are set by management
 Job description includes "ad-hoc task" or "as assigned"
 Termination for any reason

They may also take standard forms of action especially where custom terms were not negotiated during the offer:
 Warning and noting employee file for professional misconduct or insubordination
 Reassigning employee to insignificant, routine, or mundane tasks

The opposite of 'quiet quitting' is 'quiet firing', in which an employer deliberately offers only a minimum wage and benefits and denies any advances in the hope that an unwanted employee would quit. The phrase could also mean employers reducing the scope of a worker's responsibilities to encourage them to quit voluntarily. "Quiet hiring" is another term that has been used to describe a strategy by employers to give additional responsibilities and unpaid extra workload to hard-working employees.

Examples
Cases of work-to-rule have included
UK postal workers normally arrived an hour before their official start time, did unpaid overtime at the end of deliveries, used their own (uninsured) cars for deliveries, and carried mailbags too heavy by health and safety guidelines. During a dispute they arrived at start time, stopped deliveries at the end of their allotted shift, only used official vans, and weighed mailbags to keep within the limit.
French railway workers, who are not allowed to strike, were required by law to be sure of the safety of all bridges the train had to pass over; if doubtful of safety they had to consult other train crew members. During a dispute they inspected every bridge, and consulted; trains did not arrive on time.
Austrian postal workers normally accept without weighing all items that are obviously not overweight. During a dispute they observed the rule that all mail must be weighed, taking it to the scales, weighing, and then taking it back. The office was crammed with unweighed mail by the second day.
Workers may have the right to a specified number of toilet breaks; they may insist on taking the maximum allowed during a dispute.
During a work-to-rule strike, teachers may choose to instruct students during classroom hours only; and not participate in extra-curricular activities such as sports, tutoring or meetings before/after school.

Although the term quiet quitting was popularised in 2022, aspects of quiet quitting have existed in the workplace and popular culture for much longer. The film Office Space (1999) depicts a character engaging in quiet quitting; in the film, Ron Livingston's character Peter Gibbons abandons the concept of work entirely and does the bare minimum required of him.

See also
 Blue flu
 Malicious compliance
 Great Resignation
 Overtime ban

References

External links
 
 

Labor disputes
Protest tactics

he:שביתה#סוגי שביתות